Arenitalea is a Gram-negative, facultatively aerobic and rod-shaped genus of bacteria from the family of Flavobacteriaceae with one known species (Arenitalea lutea). Arenitalea lutea has been isolated from sand from the Yellow Sea.

References

Flavobacteria
Bacteria genera
Monotypic bacteria genera
Taxa described in 2013